{{Infobox boxing match
| fight date = October 1, 2005
| Fight Name = No Excuses
| location = St. Pete Times Forum, Tampa, Florida, US
| image = 
| fighter1 = Antonio Tarver
| nickname1 = The Magic Man
| record1 = 23–3 (18 KO)
| height1 = 6 ft 2 in
| weight1 = 175 lb
| style1 = Southpaw
| hometown1 = Orlando, Florida, US
| recognition1 = IBO, and The Ring light heavyweight champion[[The Ring (magazine)|The Ring]] No. 10 ranked pound-for-pound fighter
| fighter2 = Roy Jones Jr.
| nickname2 = Junior
| record2 = 49–3 (38 KO)
| hometown2 = Pensacola, Florida, US
| height2 = 5 ft 11 in
| weight2 = 173 lb
| style2 = Orthodox
| recognition2 = 4-division world champion 
| titles = IBO and The Ring light heavyweight titles
|result= Tarver wins via 12-round unanimous decision (116-112, 116-112, 117-111)

}}

Antonio Tarver vs. Roy Jones Jr. III, billed as No Excuses, was a professional boxing match contested on October 1, 2005 for Tarver's IBO and The Ring light heavyweight championships.

The fight's bill comes from a remark made by Tarver to Jones at center ring after the referees' instructions before the second fight. The referee asked both fighters, as is customary, if they had any questions, and Tarver stated: "Yeah, I got a question. You got any excuses tonight, Roy?"

Background
Tarver and Jones had fought each other twice in the previous two years. The first match took place on November 8, 2003 with Jones returning to the light heavyweight division after winning the WBA heavyweight title in his previous bout. Jones was able to narrowly defeat Tarver by majority decision to recapture the WBC light heavyweight title (which Tarver had won earlier in the year after Jones vacated it following his heavyweight title victory) and retain the WBA (Super), IBO and The Ring light heavyweight titles that he still held. The two fighters would have a rematch the following year on May 15, 2004. This time, Tarver would pick up the victory by second round knockout, becoming the first person to knock out Jones in his professional career. Jones attempted to rebound from his knockout loss to Tarver by challenging Glen Johnson for the IBF light heavyweight title, but Johnson dominated Jones for most of the fight before knocking out Jones brutally in the ninth. Tarver would then face Johnson twice, losing the first fight by a split decision, but then winning the second fight by unanimous decision to regain the IBO and The Ring'' titles. After Tarver's victory over Johnson, a third fight between him and Jones was made for October 1, 2005. Unlike the previous two fights, the WBA and WBC light heavyweight titles were not on the line. After winning the titles from Jones in the second fight, Tarver was stripped of both titles for choosing to face Johnson (who was also stripped of his IBF title) rather than face mandatory challenger Paul Briggs.

The fight
Tarver served as the aggressor for nearly the entire fight as Jones kept his distance and simply did not mount enough offense. There were no knockdowns in the fight, but Tarver came close to scoring one over Jones in the eleventh round. Tarver spent the first minute wildly throwing punches at Jones, who covered up and clinched Tarver. After the referee ordered a break, Tarver landed a right hook to Jones' head that left him severely stunned. Sensing an opportunity at a knockout victory, Tarver quickly attacked Jones, who was now against the ropes, with a left uppercut, but Tarver's momentum sent him over the ropes and nearly out of the ring. Jones retreated but Tarver quickly followed up with a 25-second flurry of punches in an effort to score the knockdown, Jones survived as Tarver soon tired from throwing so many punches. Jones then turned the tables and stalked towards the exhausted Tarver who was able to dodge most of Jones' attempts and both men were able to survive the round.

Ultimately, Tarver, landed a substantial amount of power punches and combinations and both threw and landed more punches (107 of 341) than Jones. Jones landed a higher percentage of his punches with a 36% success rate, but landed only 74 of his 207 thrown punches. All three judges scored the fight in favor of Tarver, who won with two scores of 116–112 and one score of 117–111. Unofficial HBO judge Harold Lederman scored the fight 116–112 for Tarver, while ESPN scored the fight 118–111 for Tarver.

References

Tarver 3
2005 in boxing
Boxing in Florida
Sports competitions in Tampa, Florida
2005 in sports in Florida
October 2005 sports events in the United States